Hartshorn is the antler of male red deer.

Derivatives
Various nitrogen compounds were made from hartshorn shavings:
 Oil of hartshorn is a crude chemical product obtained from the destructive distillation of deer antlers.
 Salt of hartshorn refers to ammonium carbonate, an early form of smelling salts obtained by dry distillation of oil of hartshorn.
 Spirit of hartshorn (or spirits of hartshorn) is an archaic name for aqueous ammonia. Originally, this term was applied to a solution manufactured from the hooves and antlers of the red deer, as well as those of some other animals. The aqueous solution was colorless and pungent, consisting of about 28.5 percent ammonia. It was used chiefly as a detergent, for removing stains and extracting certain vegetable coloring agents, and in the manufacture of ammonium salts. Later, the term was applied to the partially purified similar products of the action of heat on nitrogenous animal matter generally. Finally, the term was applied to any aqueous solution of ammonia.

Uses

Medicine 
Hartshorn jelly or a decoction of burnt hartshorn in water was used to treat diarrhea. The coal of hartshorn, called calcinated hartshorn, was used as an absorbent, as well as in the treatment of dysentery. Salt of hartshorn (ammonium carbonate) was used as a sudorific for treatment of fevers, and as a smelling salt. Hartshorn was used to treat insect bites, sunstroke, stye, and snakebites.

Baking
Hartshorn salt (ammonium carbonate), also known simply as hartshorn, and baker's ammonia, was used as a leavening agent, in the baking of cookies and other edible treats. It was used mainly in the seventeenth and eighteenth centuries as a forerunner of baking powder. A half-teaspoon of hartshorn can substitute for one teaspoon of baking powder. It is called for in old German and Scandinavian recipes and, although rarely used in modern times, may still be purchased as a baking ingredient. Hartshorn helps molded cookies such as Springerle to retain their intricate designs during baking. Cookies made with hartshorn can be kept for a long time without hardening. Use of hartshorn may turn some ingredients, such as sunflower seeds, green.

Ammonium carbonate is especially suited to thin, dry cookies and crackers. When heated, it releases ammonia and carbon dioxide gases, but no water. The absence of water allows cookies to cook and dry out more quickly, and thinner cookies allow the pungent ammonia to escape, rather than to remain trapped, as it would in a deeper mass.

Safety concerns
Ammonia released during the baking process reacts with glucose and fructose to form intermediate molecules that in turn, react with asparagine (an amino acid found in nuts, seeds, and whole grains) to form acrylamide, a carcinogen.

References

Traditional medicine